Donald Hoyte Pepper (born October 8, 1943) is an American former professional baseball player. He was a first baseman whose seven-year (1962–1968) professional career included a four-game trial in the majors with the Detroit Tigers in 1966.

Pepper graduated from Saratoga Springs High School in 1961 and signed with the Tigers for $15,000.

Pepper's career was spent with the Detroit organization. In his best season, 1966 with the Double-A Montgomery Rebels, he batted .302 and reached career highs in home runs (19) and runs batted in (87). Called up to the Tigers after the post-September 1 roster expansion, Pepper was a pinch hitter in three contests (he grounded out, struck out, and flied out in his three at bats). In his fourth game, he was a defensive replacement for veteran Tiger first baseman Norm Cash, but did not bat.

At age 24, Pepper made the cover of Sports Illustrated in March , along with Johnny Bench, Cisco Carlos, Alan Foster, and Mike Torrez, as "The Best Rookies of 1968."

In 1969, Pepper refused a minor league assignment and retired, moving home to Wilton, New York to work on his family's turkey farm.

He is the father of Dottie Pepper, a professional golfer and golf commentator.

References

External links

1943 births
Living people
Baseball players from New York (state)
Detroit Tigers players
Lakeland Tigers players
Major League Baseball first basemen
Montgomery Rebels players
Sportspeople from Saratoga Springs, New York
Thomasville Tigers players
Toledo Mud Hens players
People from Wilton, New York